West Timor may refer to:
The Austronesian Timor–Babar languages
The Papuan Alor–Pantar languages plus Bunak